Giovanni Serafini (15 October 1786 - 1 February 1855) was an Italian Cardinal. He was the Cardinal-Deacon of Santi Vito, Modesto e Crescenzio from 1843 to 1846 and then the Cardinal-Deacon of Santa Maria in Cosmedin from 1846 until his death.

References

External links
Catholic Hierarchy 

19th-century Italian cardinals
1786 births
1855 deaths
Cardinals created by Pope Gregory XVI